Birampur is an upazilla of Dinajpur District in the Division of Rangpur, Bangladesh. Birampur is an important city near India Border. This upazila is 256 km away from Capital Dhaka and nearly 56 km away from Dinajpur City. In spite of being far from Capital this north Bengal city is flourishing economically and Culturally. A branch of the Jamuna River flows through Birampur Upazila.

Geography
Birampur has 25770 households and total area 211.81 km2. It is an upazila of Dinajpur.

Birampur Upazilla is bounded by Fulbari and Nawabganj  Upazillas on the north, Nawabganj and Hakimpur Upazillas on the east, Hakimpur Upazila and Hili CD Block in Dakshin Dinajpur district, West Bengal, India, on the south and Kumarganj CD Block in Dakshin Dinajpur district, West Bengal, India, on the west.

Rivers and lakes
Jamuna
Asholar Beel 
Chengar Beel
Bogghar Beel
Katuar Beel

Demographics

As of the 1991 Bangladesh census, Birampur has a population of 134778. Males constitute 51.12% of the population, and females 48.88%. This Upazilla's eighteen up population is 68878. Literacy rate and educational institutions Average literacy 46.9%; male 51.7%, female 42%. The Population of Birampur Total 150620; male 77517, female 73103; Muslim 134654, Hindu 8142, Buddhist 3689, Christian 40 and others 4095.
The Density of Forestry in Birampur is approximately 18.5%.

Administration
Birampur Thana was formed on 17 June 1981 and it was turned into an upazila in 1983.

Birampur Upazilla is divided into Birampur Municipality and seven union parishads: Benail, Dior, Jotbani, Katla, Khanpur, Mukundapur, and Pali Prayagpur. The union parishads are subdivided into 171 mauzas and 169 villages.

Birampur Municipality was formed in 1995. It was subdivided into 9 wards and 26 mahallas.

Md. Khairul Alam Raju is now the Upazila Chairman in the Upazila Chairman election. Election held on 18 March 2019. And so on Md. Liakat Ali Sarker Tutul is working as Mayor of Birampur Pouroshova. Md. Towhidur Rahman is our running U.N.O.

Economy
The main sources of income Agriculture 68.37%, non-agricultural labourer 2.92%, industry 0.86%, commerce 13.08%, transport and communication 2.64%, service 5.1%, construction 0.67%, religious service 0.16%, rent and remittance 0.17% and others 6.03%.
Ownership of agricultural land landowner 57.24%, landless 42.76%; agricultural landowner: urban 44.34% and rural 61.34%. The main crops of Birampur are paddy, wheat, corn, jute, potato, vegetables. Mustard, sugarcane and sesame are near extinction. The main fruits are mango, banana, jackfruit, and blackberry. There are 17 fisheries, dairies and poultries.

Contributions

Liberation War 1971 
History of the War of Liberation On 20 April 1971, the Pak army killed a few hundred innocent people at Charar Hat of Birampur. Seven Pakistani soldiers and 16 freedom fighters were killed in a direct encounter between the freedom fighters and the Pakistan army at Ketra Hat. On 4 December the general public of the upazila attacked a military vehicle of the Pak army at Beparitola and killed a number of Pak soldiers.

Education
The upazila has 5 colleges, 1 textile institute, 38 secondary schools, 162 primary schools, 28 madrasas. There is also a digital school in the upazila named Birampur ICT School.

Educational institutions
Birampur Government College (1964)
Birampur Mahila Degree College (1989)
Birampur Technical and Management College (2001)
Adarsha High School and Vocational Institute (1994)
Birampur Pilot High School (1945)
Ekair Mangalpur High School (1930)
Shibpur High School (1951)
Birampur Government Girl's High School (1971)
Ideal High School (1998)
Shiyala Government Primary School (1964)
Bijul Darul Huda Kamil Madrasa (1958)
Mukundapur Senior Madrasa (1974)
Birampur ICT School (2018)
Katla High School (1966)

Gallery

See also
Upazilas of Bangladesh
Districts of Bangladesh
Divisions of Bangladesh

References

 
Upazilas of Dinajpur District, Bangladesh

ru:Бирампур